The 2020 Capital Football season is the 67th season in Capital Football. All NPL and grassroots competitions were suspended due to the impacts from the COVID-19 pandemic in Australia. The season resumed on 18 July.

2020 National Premier Leagues Capital Football
The 2020 National Premier Leagues Capital Football season, is the eighth season of the National Premier Leagues Capital Football in Australia. The regular season commenced on 18 July 2020, delayed due to the impacts of the COVID-19 pandemic in Australia. Promotion/relegation has been suspended for the 2020 season. The NPL Premier normally qualifies for the national NPL finals series, but the 2020 National Premier Leagues finals series was cancelled in July.

League tables
After the first 7 rounds of the season, the teams were split into a Top and Bottom four, with teams in each section playing each other once, with all points and goals reset to zero.  The two highest placed teams from the upper group qualify for the season's Grand Final, and two highest placed teams from the lower group qualify for a Playoff game.

Stage 1

Stage 2

Finals

2020 National Premier Leagues Capital Football 2

League table
Each team played each other once for a total of 10 rounds, plus a finals series for the top 4 teams. Promotion/relegation was suspended for the 2020 season due to the disruptions to the season caused by the COVID-19 pandemic in Australia.

Finals

2020 Women's National Premier Leagues ACT

The highest tier domestic football competition in the ACT is known as the ACT Women's National Premier Leagues (WNPL). Each team played each other once for a total of 8 rounds, plus a finals series for the top 4 teams. Promotion/relegation was suspended for the 2020 season.

Finals

2020 Men's Federation Cup 
2020 was planned to be the 58th edition of the Capital Football Federation Cup, however it was suspended and ultimately cancelled before any games were played. The preliminary rounds would have doubled as the Capital Football qualifiers for the 2020 FFA Cup, but that competition was also cancelled.

See also 

Soccer in the Australian Capital Territory
Sport in the Australian Capital Territory

References 

Capital Football
Capital Football season, 2020